The WTA South Carolina is a defunct WTA Tour affiliated tennis tournament played from 1985 to 1987.  It was held in two locations; once on Seabrook Island, in 1985, and the final two times at the Wild Dunes on the Isle of Palms.  The competition was played on outdoor clay courts.

Past finals

Singles

Doubles

References
 WTA Tour history

Clay court tennis tournaments
Defunct tennis tournaments in the United States
Recurring events disestablished in 1987
Recurring sporting events established in 1985
Tennis in South Carolina
WTA Tour
1985 establishments in South Carolina
1987 disestablishments in South Carolina